Zhilino is a rural locality (a selo) and the administrative center of Zhilinsky Selsoviet, Pervomaysky District, Altai Krai, Russia. The population was 937 as of 2013. There are 14 streets.

Geography 
Zhilino is located 33 km east of Novoaltaysk (the district's administrative centre) by road. Malakhovo is the nearest rural locality.

References 

Rural localities in Pervomaysky District, Altai Krai